Sir James Steuart of Coltness (1608 – 31 March 1681) was a Scottish merchant, banker, landowner, politician and Covenanter.

Early life
Steuart was the second son of Marion Carmichael and James Steuart (1575–1607), of Allanton, Lanarkshire, and was born posthumously. Marion was sister of Sir James Carmichael, Justice General of Scotland.

Career
He was a merchant and banker in Edinburgh, acquired a large fortune, then acquired the estates of Kirkfield (from Sir John Somerville of Cambusnethan) and Coldness (from Sir John Hamilton of Edston), both in Lanarkshire, in 1653.

He became a burgess of Edinburgh and guild member in 1631, apparently through his marriage to Thomas Hope's niece.

Public office
Steuart served as Provost of Edinburgh from 1648 to 1652, Commissioner for Edinburgh to the Parliament of Scotland from 1649 to 1650, and Lord Provost again in 1659. For a period of time, he was the Collector of Excise and Accountant-General for the Scottish Army.

His period of office as Provost included the decision to fortify the harbour of Leith and to create a new road between Edinburgh and Leith (later called Leith Walk.

Scottish Restoration
At the Restoration (1660) he was dismissed from public roles due to his being a Covenanter. After confinement in Edinburgh Castle, Steuart was sent to Dundee as a prisoner. He was granted a pardon in 1670.

Personal life
In 1630, he married Anne Hope (d. 1646), daughter of Henry Hope and niece of Sir Thomas Hope of Craighall. Together, they had:
Sir Thomas Steuart, 1st Baronet of Coltness (1631–1698)
Sir James Steuart of Goodtrees (1635–1713)
William Steuart (1640–1700)
Sir Robert Steuart, 1st Baronet of Allanbank (1643–1707)
Marion Steuart (1645–1706), who married John Maxwell (1648–1732)

In 1648, two years after Anne's death, Steuart married Marion McCulloch Elliott (d. 1690), widow of Sir John Elliott, and only daughter and heiress of David McCulloch, of Goodtrees.

Sir James Steuart died on 31 March 1681.

See also
Steuart baronets

References
Notes

Sources
Joseph Foster, Members of Parliament, Scotland (London and Aylesbury, 1882), p. 326

1608 births
1681 deaths
Covenanters
Lord Provosts of Edinburgh
Burgh Commissioners to the Parliament of Scotland
Members of the Parliament of Scotland 1648–1651
Scottish bankers
Scottish merchants
17th-century Scottish people
17th-century Scottish politicians
Politicians from Edinburgh
Scottish knights
Scottish prisoners and detainees
17th-century Scottish businesspeople